Brad Lee Hoffman (born March 6, 1953) is a retired American basketball player who represented the United States in the 1978 FIBA World Championship.  Hoffman played collegiately at the University of North Carolina.

Hoffman, a 5'10 guard from Columbus, Ohio, played for the North Carolina Tar Heels from 1972–75. He played sparingly for his first two years, then became a regular rotation player for his senior season.

After graduating from UNC, Hoffman played basketball for Athletes in Action (AIA), a faith-based sports organization.  In 1978, this move paid dividends for Hoffman as AIA was selected to represent the United States in the 1978 FIBA World Championships in Manila due to the timing of the tournament ruling out the participation of active college players. The U.S. finished fifth in the games with a 6–4 record.  Hoffman finished fourth on the team in scoring, averaging 11.7 points per game in the ten tournament contests.

References 

1953 births
Living people
American men's basketball players
Basketball players from Columbus, Ohio
North Carolina Tar Heels men's basketball players
Point guards
United States men's national basketball team players
1978 FIBA World Championship players